Al Sheikh Muhammed Jameel Didi (May 1, 1915 – March 15, 1989), popularly known as Jameel Didi, was a Maldivian political figure and poet who was famous for his writings and speeches. He was born on 1 May 1915 to Abdullah Kamaaludhin the Attorney General and Fenfoa'gan'duvaru Aminaa Didi. At first, he studied at the Majeedhiyya School and later went abroad to Egypt and studied at Al-Azhar University. After returning, he became a member of the sentence committee (niyaa kanda alhaa komety). He later served as Minister of Justice from 10 September 1953 and as Attorney General from 30 May 1956.

Muhammad Jameel Didi has written many books. To help with Dhivehi grammar he wrote a book called "Fiyavalhu", and also "kudakudhinge bageecha 1" and "kudakudhinge bageecha 2", two Dhivehi children's books. He also wrote Islamic books such as "Thauleemuh Dhiyana" and "Dhuroosul Akhlaaq".

The Maldivian national anthem, Gaumii salaam, uses lyrics written by Jameel Didi in 1948 and until 1972 was sung to the tune of Auld Lang Syne which he heard on his uncle's alarm clock.

Many of Jameel's children and grandchildren were and are renowned politicians in the governments of Presidents Maumoon and Nasheed. Sheikh Jameel Didi died on March 15, 1989, at the age of 73. He is buried in Galolhu Cemetery where many of the Maldivian royal family are buried. After his death the honour of Usthazul Jeel (the teacher of the generation) was bestowed upon him by President Maumoon Abdul Gayoom.

Muhammad Jameel was one of the foremost Maldivian learned men. He translated religious books and foreign tales or fables, adapting them to the island context, making a contribution to Maldivian folklore.

See also 
 Folklore of the Maldives

References

Muslim poets
Maldivian writers
1915 births
1989 deaths
National anthem writers
Al-Azhar University alumni
Government ministers of the Maldives
20th-century poets
20th-century Maldivian writers